Bayer Giants Leverkusen is a professional basketball club, part of the TSV Bayer 04 Leverkusen sports club based in Leverkusen, Germany. It currently plays in ProA, the second division of German basketball.

Based on the number of titles, Leverkusen is the most successful team in the history of German Basketball. In 2009, the Bayer company cut down sponsorship and the club went down to Germany's ProB (third division) to restructure. The license for the Basketball Bundesliga was transferred to the newly formed Giants Düsseldorf.

History
Founded as TuS Bayer 04 Leverkusen in 1961, the club moved up to first division Basketball Bundesliga in 1968. The club won 5 national championships and 4 German Cups as TuS 04 Leverkusen before it changed its name and continued its dominance as TSV Bayer 04 Leverkusen. Until today, the club has won more national titles than any other German basketball team.

To the disdain of all of its supporters, in 2008 the Bayer company decided to make dramatic cuts in its sponsorship for the team and simply focus on its football operations and amateur athletics. This move forced the club's basketball team to cede its Basketball Bundesliga license to the newly formed Giants Düsseldorf and move down to Germany's 3rd Division Pro B to restructure.

Thousands of club supporters gathered in the streets of Leverkusen to protest the company's move.

In 2013, the club promoted to the ProA League.

Season by season

Honours
German Champions
Winners (14): 1970, 1971, 1972, 1976, 1979, 1985, 1986, 1990, 1991, 1992, 1993, 1994, 1995, 1996
German Cup:
Winners (10): 1970, 1971, 1974, 1976, 1986, 1987, 1990, 1991, 1993, 1995
ProB
Winners (1): 2013

Roster

Notable players
To appear in this section a player must have played at least two seasons for the club AND either:
– Set a club record or won an individual award as a professional player.
– Played at least one official international match for his senior national team at any time.

Head coaches

References

External links
 Team Homepage 

Basketball teams established in 1961
Bayer 04 Leverkusen
Basketball clubs in North Rhine-Westphalia
1961 establishments in West Germany